Roy Smiles (born 1966) is a singer-songwriter & playwright from Ealing, West London. He is also an occasional actor.

Smiles has written twenty seven theatre plays, the best known of which is Kurt and Sid, a 2009 London West End production about the fictional meeting of Sid Vicious and Kurt Cobain, starring Danny Dyer & Sean Evans.

He has released eight albums of songs: Drunks & Dreamers, Time's Moving On, Seize The Day, Autumn Song, Bremen, The Trains & The Rain, Northern Angels & Lost Souls.

Career
His first play staged in 1992 at the Battersea Arts Centre, Schmucks was about a fictitious meeting between Groucho Marx and Lenny Bruce.

Smiles's stage plays focus largely on biographical subjects such as Albert Camus (The Weight Of Days), Evelyn Waugh (Waugh In Winter), Marilyn Monroe/Arthur Miller (Reno), George Orwell (Year of the Rat), Tony Hancock (The Lad Himself) & Robert F. Kennedy (The Last Pilgrim).

A number of his plays have debuted or transferred to theatres around the world, such as Pythonesque, the story of the Monty Python team, which opened in South Africa in 2008 before moving to Edinburgh as part of the Fringe Festival in 2009.

The Boys Of Summer - his play set in a HIV ward was staged at the Old Red Lion in 1995, with Ian Bartholomew.

Stand Up - his play about the London stand up comedy scene was staged at the Old Red Lion in 1999, with Lucy Davies. It was revived at The Kings Head Theatre in 2006 under the title The Ho-Ho Club directed by Karl Howman and starring Sally Lindsay. 

Bombing People - a farce about the Enola Gay, was staged at the Jermyn Street Theatre in 2000, with Michael Fitzgerald.

In 2002 he played the role of Itzak Heller, a Jewish collaborator, in Roman Polanski's Oscar winning Best Picture The Pianist.

Ying Tong - A Walk with the Goons, the story of Spike Milligan's nervous breakdown whilst writing The Goon Show, was staged at West Yorkshire Playhouse in 2004, transferring the following year to the New Ambassadors Theatre in London's West End before touring the US, Australia, New Zealand and South Africa.

Year Of The Rat - his play about George Orwell's attempt to woo wife-to-be Sonia Brownell whilst writing 1984 was staged at West Yorkshire Playhouse in 2007, with Hugo Speer as Orwell.

Good Evening - about the Beyond The Fringe team was broadcast on Radio 4 in 2008, with Benedict Cumberbatch as Dudley Moore.

The Last Pilgrim - about Senator Robert F. Kennedy's doomed campaign for the American Presidency was staged in London in 2010.

The Lad Himself - his play about self loathing radio & TV comedian Tony Hancock was staged at the Edinburgh Festival in 2013.

Memories Of A Cad - his radio play about actor Terry-Thomas dealing with Parkinson's Disease was broadcast on Radio 4 in 2014, with Martin Jarvis as Terry-Thomas & Alistair McGowen as Richard Briers.

Reno - his play about Marilyn Monroe & Arthur Miller's marriage imploding during the making of The Misfits had its world premiere at the Brighton Festival in 2014.

Plum - his play about writer PG Wodehouse's infamous broadcasts from Berlin in WW2 was staged at The Court Theatre in Christchurch in 2014.

Year of the Rat, Ying Tong , Pythonesque and Kurt & Sid are published by Oberon Books.

Funny People, his book on his comedy heroes, was published by Oberon Books in 2016.

Ten Plays by Roy Smiles was published by Oberon Books in 2018. Containing his plays on Albert Camus, Richard Burton, Oscar Wilde/George Bernard Shaw, Evelyn Waugh, Tony Hancock, Lenny Bruce, the Enola Gay, the Iraq War, Marilyn Monroe/Arthur Miller & the 2011 London Riots.

Ying Tong, Pythonesque and Good Evening were broadcast on BBC Radio 4. As were his plays: Dear Arthur Love John, Goodnight From Him and Memories Of A Cad.

Two compilations of songs: Go Gently (Best Of) A Land Called Home (Best Of II) were released on Spotify in August 2021.

The Funny Girls - his play about Barbra Streisand & Joan Rivers rivalry/friendship, was first staged at The Wimbledon Theatre in September 2021.

The albums: 40 Big Hits and 40 More Big Hits were released on Spotify in January 2022.

His first album Drunks & Dreamers was released on Spotify in March 2022.

His 2nd album Time's Moving On was released on Spotify in April 2022.

The Lad Himself, his play about Tony Hancock, had its London premiere at Upstairs At The Gate in Highgate in April 2022.

His third album Seize The Day was released on Spotify in May 2022.

His fourth album Autumn Song was released on Spotify in June 2022.

His fifth and sixth albums: Bremen and The Trains & The Rain were released on Spotify in July 2022.

His seventh album Northern Angels was released on Spotify in August 2022.

His eighth album Lost Souls was released on Spotify in September 2022.

A Dry October: Bottom Cancer & How To Survive It, his book about surviving bowel cancer, was released by Amazon Books in January 2023.

Forty three of his plays are published by Amazon Books.

Plays

Schmucks – Battersea Arts Centre, London, 8 July 1992
Roberto Calvi Is Alive & Well – Finborough Theatre, London, 14 October 1992
Top of the Town – Kings Head Theatre, London, 1992
Idiot's Waltz – Finborough Theatre, London, 9 September 1993
The Court Jester – Warehouse Theatre, Croydon, London, 13 December 1994
Danny Boy – Etcetera Theatre, London, 1994
The Boys of Summer – Old Red Lion Theatre, London, 11 July 1995
Dinner with the Borgias – Warehouse Theatre, Croydon, London, 8 December 1995
The Promised Land – Kings Head Theatre, London 1995
Get It While You Can, A Conversation With Janis Joplin – Etcetera Theatre, London, 3 November 1996
The Exiles (or Highgate Shuffle) – Hen and Chickens Theatre, London, 30 November 1997
Stand-Up – Old Red Lion Theatre, London, 23 March 1999
Bombing People – Jermyn Street Theatre, London, 22 August 2000

Sick Dictators – Jermyn Street Theatre, London, 31 July 2001
Lunatic's Tango – Hen and Chickens Theatre, London, 26 April 2002
Ying Tong: A Walk with the Goons – West Yorkshire Playhouse, Leeds, 22 October 2004
The Ho Ho Club  (formerly Stand Up) – Kings Head Theatre, Islington, London, 26 June 2006
Good Evening – Theatre-on-the-Bay, South Africa, 2007
Year of the Rat – The Forge at The Court Theatre, Christchurch, New Zealand, 19 October 2007
Pythonesque – Theatre-on-the-Bay, South Africa, 2008
Kurt and Sid – Trafalgar Studios, London 9 September 2009
Backstage – The Forge at The Court Theatre, Christchurch, New Zealand, 30 October 2009
The Last Pilgrim – The White Bear Theatre, London, 28 September 2010
Burlesque – A Musical (co-written with Adam Megiddo) – Jermyn Street Theatre, 9 November 2011.
 The Lad Himself – The Gilded Balloon, Edinburgh Festival, 1 August 2012.  
Plum – The Court Theatre, Christchurch, New Zealand, 9 August 2014.
Reno – The Rialto Theatre, Brighton, 16 December 2014.

The Funny Girls - Wimbledon Studio Theatre, 17 September 2021.

References

External links

1956 births
Living people
English dramatists and playwrights
Date of birth missing (living people)
English male film actors
English male singer-songwriters
English male television actors
Male actors from London
English male dramatists and playwrights